Alpha-1,6-mannosylglycoprotein 6-beta-N-acetylglucosaminyltransferase A is an enzyme that in humans is encoded by the MGAT5 gene.

This gene encodes mannosyl (alpha-1,6-)-glycoprotein beta-1,6-N-acetyl-glucosaminyltransferase, a glycosyltransferase involved in the synthesis of protein-bound and lipid-bound oligosaccharides. Alterations of the oligosaccharides on cell surface glycoproteins cause significant changes in the adhesive or migratory behavior of a cell. Increase in the encoded protein's activity may correlate with the progression of invasive malignancies.

References

Further reading